Live at Selwyn Hall, an album by Shooglenifty, was released in 1996 on the WOMAD label. It was recorded at Selwyn Hall, the village hall of Box, Wiltshire.

Track listing
 "The Pipe Tunes: John McKenzie's Fancy/The Kitchen Piper" – 6:07
 "The Radical Road: The Radical Road/Lexie Macaskill" – 4:22
 "Two Fifty to Vigo" – 5:54
 "Hoptsoi" – 6:35
 "Venus in Tweeds" – 5:19
 "Waiting for Conrad" – 8:07
 "Good Drying: Flick It Up and Catch It/The Creepy Zone/Good Drying" – 5:13
 "Da Eye Wifey: Da Eye Wifey/Wood's No. 1" – 6:51
 "The Tammienorrie: The Tamminorrie/Leo Elsey's Reel/Le Reel des Voyageurs" – 5:21

Sources and links
 

Shooglenifty albums
1996 live albums
Real World Records live albums